Bat Garvey (December 1864 – 1932) was an English footballer who played in The Football League for Aston Villa.

Bat Garvey signed for Aston Hall Swifts F.C. in 1886 and then for Aston Shakespeare in 1887.

Season 1888-89
Garvey played in the debut Football League Aston Villa team at Dudley Road, Wolverhampton, then home of Wolverhampton Wanderers'. The match was played on 8 September 1888 and ended in a 1–1 draw. Garvey played at inside-left. Garvey only played one more match that season, the last game of the season when Villa got thrashed 2–5 at County Ground, Derby.

Batty scored a hat-trick in the 6–1 home league victory over Stoke City on 7 December 1889.

Statistics
Source:

References

External links
AVFC History Batty Garvey

1864 births
1932 deaths
English footballers
Aston Villa F.C. players
English Football League players
Association football forwards